State of Emergency is a Nigerian action movie about ministers of state in Nigeria being taken hostage by armed robbers who wanted a ransom from the state.

Cast
Ejike Asiegbu
Bimbo Manuel
Saint Obi
Rachael Oniga
J.T. Tom West

References

External links

2000s English-language films
English-language Nigerian films